Clive Leslie Lucas  (born 14 November 1943) is an Australian restoration architect and was once the principal and founding partner of the firm Clive Lucas, Stapleton & Partners – Architects and Heritage Consultants now known as Lucas Stapleton Johnson, which specializes in the field of architectural restoration.

He is a current board member of the National Trust of Australia (NSW) and member of the Trust's Properties Committee. He was previously vice-president of the Trust and Founder, former chairman and Trustee of the Historic Houses Trust of NSW (now Sydney Living Museums).

The degree of Doctor of Science in architecture (honoris causa) was conferred upon Lucas at the Faculty of Architecture, Design & Planning graduation ceremony held in the Great Hall at 9.30am on Friday 15 April 2011. Lucas is described as !Sydney's most prominent heritage architect" by the Sydney Morning Herald.

Early life
Lucas was born in Sydney and has a BArch (1966) from the University of Sydney.

Selected restoration and design works

 The officers' Houses – Port Arthur, Tasmania
 Treasury Buildings (now InterContinental Hotel) – Macquarie Street, Sydney
 Kirribilli House – Prime Minister of Australia's residence, Sydney
 Lyndhurst – Glebe, New South Wales
 Old Government House – Parramatta, Museum of the National Trust of Australia (NSW)
 Hyde Park Barracks – Sydney, Museum of the Historic Houses Trust of New South Wales
 The Mint – Sydney, Headquarters of the Historic Houses Trust of New South Wales
 Treaty House – New Zealand
 Liner House – Bridge Street, Sydney
 Albert Wing, St. Paul's College – University of Sydney

Publications
 Australian Colonial Architecture (1978)
 Colour Schemes for Old Australian Houses (1984) jointly
 Australian Country Houses (1987)

Awards
 Officer, Order of the British Empire (1977)
 The firm has won 46 awards from the Australian Institute of Architects.
 2012 Australian Institute of Architects Lachlan Macquarie Award for Heritage for the Restoration of Swifts, Darling Point

References

External links
 Lucas, Stapleton, Johnson & Partners website
 Restoration of Colonial Cottage, Miller Point
 Restoration of Old Government House, Parramatta
 Restoration of The Mint, Sydney
 Restoration of Glenfield, Casula

1943 births
Living people
Australian Officers of the Order of the British Empire
New South Wales architects